Bernard Allan Federko (born May 12, 1956) is a Canadian former professional ice hockey centre of Ukrainian ancestry who played fourteen seasons in the National Hockey League from 1976 through 1990.

Playing career
Federko began playing hockey at a young age in his home town of Foam Lake, Saskatchewan. He was captain of the 1971 Bantam provincial champions. He also played Senior hockey with the local Foam Lake Flyers of the Fishing Lake Hockey League, winning the league scoring title as a bantam-aged player. Federko continued his career with the Saskatoon Blades of the WHL where he set and still holds the team record for assists. He played three seasons with the Blades, and in his final year with the club he led the league in assists and points in both the regular season and playoffs. Federko was drafted 7th overall by the St. Louis Blues in the 1976 NHL Amateur Draft. He started the next season with the Kansas City Blues of the Central Hockey League and was leading the league in points when he was called up mid-season to play 31 games with St. Louis. He scored three hat tricks in those 31 games. In the 1978–79 NHL season, Federko developed into a bona fide star, as he scored 95 points.

Federko scored 100 points in a season four times, and was a consistent and underrated performer for the Blues. Federko scored at least 90 points in seven of the eight seasons between 1978 and 1986, and became the first player in NHL history to record at least 50 assists in 10 consecutive seasons. However, in an era when Wayne Gretzky was scoring 200 points a season, Federko never got the attention many felt he deserved. In 1986, in a poll conducted by GOAL magazine, he was named the most overlooked talent in hockey. His General Manager Ron Caron said he was "A great playmaker. He makes the average or above average player look like a star at times. He's such an unselfish player."

On March 19, 1988, Federko became the 22nd NHL player to record 1000 career points. After a poor season for Federko in 1988–89, he was traded to the Detroit Red Wings with Tony McKegney for future Blues star Adam Oates, and Paul MacLean. In Detroit, Federko re-united with former Blues head coach Jacques Demers, but he had to play behind Steve Yzerman and did not get his desired ice time. After his lowest point output since his rookie season, Federko decided to retire after the 1989–90 season, having played exactly 1,000 NHL games with his final game on April 1, 1990.

Post-NHL career
Less than a year after retiring as a player, the Blues retired number 24 in his honor on March 16, 1991. Federko was eventually inducted into the Hockey Hall of Fame in 2002, the first Hall of Famer to earn his credentials primarily as a Blue.

Currently, Federko is a television color commentator for Bally Sports Midwest during Blues broadcasts. Federko was the head coach/general manager of the St. Louis Vipers roller hockey team of the Roller Hockey International for the 1993 and 1994 seasons.

Awards
Bob Brownridge Memorial Trophy (WCHL leading scorer) - 1976
Named to the WCHL First All-Star Team (1976)
Named WCHL MVP (1976)
Named to the CHL Second All-Star Team (1977)
Won Ken McKenzie Trophy as CHL Rookie of the Year (1977)
Played in the NHL All-Star Game (1980, 1981)
Named NHL Player of the Week (For week ending December 3, 1984)

Records
St. Louis Blues team record for career games played (927)
St. Louis Blues team record for career assists (721)
St. Louis Blues team record for career points (1073)
Shares St. Louis Blues team record for assists in one game (5 on February 27, 1988)
St. Louis Blues team record for career playoff assists (66)
Held St. Louis Blues team record for points in one playoff year (21 in 1986); Until Ryan O'Reilly in 2019 with 23 (Won Conn Smythe & Stanley Cup)
Held St. Louis Blues team record for assists in one playoff year (15 in 1982); Until Alex Pietrangelo in 2019 with 16 (Won Stanley Cup)
NHL Record
- First player to get 50 assists in 10 consecutive seasons in NHL history.

Career statistics

See also
List of NHL players with 1,000 points
List of NHL players with 1,000 games played
List of NHL players with 100-point seasons
Hockey Hall of Fame
List of NHL statistical leaders

References

Citations

General references

External links
 
 St. Louis Blues Website

 
 

 
 

 
 

1956 births
Canadian ice hockey centres
Canadian people of Ukrainian descent
Detroit Red Wings players
Edmonton Oilers (WHA) draft picks
Hockey Hall of Fame inductees
Ice hockey people from Saskatchewan
Kansas City Blues players
Living people
National Hockey League broadcasters
National Hockey League first-round draft picks
National Hockey League players with retired numbers
Saskatoon Blades players
St. Louis Blues announcers
St. Louis Blues draft picks
St. Louis Blues players
World Hockey Association first round draft picks